El Fausto criollo ("The Creole Faust") is a 1979 Argentine fantasy drama film directed by Luis Saslavsky and Miguel Angel Lumaldo. It was written by Saslavsky with the collaboration of Estela Canto, Luisa Mercedes Levinson and Enrique Anderson Imbert, and based on the novel El Fausto Criollo, by Estanislao del Campo. It stars Claudio García Satur, María Valenzuela, Pedro Quartucci, Luisa Vehil and Gerardo Romano. Oscar Aráiz was in charge of the film's choreography. It was filmed in Eastmancolor and released on October 25, 1979.

Synopsis 
Anastasio, a.k.a. "El Pollo" (The Chicken), narrates to a gaucho named Laguna the performance of the opera Faust, which he has just seen on a representation at a Buenos Aires theatre. Suddenly real life and fiction intersperse, with Anastasio imagining a similar story in La Pampa, while assuming the personality of the protagonist at the moment when the character signs his pact with the Devil.

Cast
 Claudio García Satur
 Daniel Fanego
 María Valenzuela
 Luisa Vehil
 Eva Franco
 Eduardo Galán
 Gerardo Romano
 Erika Wallner
 Luis Medina Castro
 Héctor Pellegrini
 Pedro Quartucci
 Romualdo Quiroga

References

External links
 

1979 films
1970s Spanish-language films
Films directed by Luis Saslavsky
1970s fantasy films
Argentine fantasy films
Films based on novels
Films based on multiple works
Films based on Goethe's Faust
The Devil in film
1970s Argentine films